Berlin was the capital city of the German Empire from 1871 to 1945, its eastern part the de facto capital of East Germany from 1949 to 1990, and has been the capital of the unified Federal Republic of Germany since June, 1991. The city has an active LGBT community with a long history. Berlin has many LGBTIQ+ friendly districts, though the borough of Schöneberg is widely viewed both locally and by visitors as Berlin's gayborhood. Particularly the boroughs North-West near Nollendorfplatz identifies as Berlin's "Regenbogenkiez" (Rainbow District), with a certain concentration of gay bars near and along Motzstraße and Fuggerstraße. Where as in East Berlin the district of Prenzlauer Berg became synonymous with the East Germany LGBT movement beginning in 1973 with the founding of the HIB. Schöneberg's gayborhood has a lot to offer for locals and tourists alike, and caters to, and is particularly popular with gay men. Berlin's large LGBT events such as the Lesbian and Gay City Festival, East Berlin Leather and Fetish Week, Folsom Europe, and CSD center around Schöneberg, with related events taking place city-wide during these events. Nevertheless, with roughly 180 years of LGBTIQ+ history, and a very large community made up of members with very varied biographies, it is hard to find a place in Berlin completely without LGBT culture past or present. Berlin's present-day neighborhoods with a certain concentration of LGBTIQ+ oriented culture vary somewhat in terms of history, demography, and where the emphasis in each neighborhoods' queer culture falls along the LGBTIQ+ spectrum. Over the course of its nearly two centuries of queer history (herstory), definitions not with standing, Berlin's LGBTIQ+ culture has never ceased to change, not only in appearance and self-understanding, but also in where the centers of queer culture were located in the city. What is true about Berlin's "LGBT culture in Berlin" at one point in time, in a given place and from a given perspective, is almost certainly different the next.

History

Berlin has a long history of LGBT culture and activism. By the 1920s the city had a reputation, among insiders at least, for being relatively LGBT friendly. By that time LGBT-oriented publications and organizations already existed in Berlin. The world's first gay magazine,  (The Unique) was published in Berlin beginning in 1896. Magnus Hirschfeld, a German physician, founded the Scientific-Humanitarian Committee (German: Wissenschaftlich-Humanitäres Kommittee (WHK)) in May 1897 in the context of his Institute for the Science of Sexuality. Though there are earlier German proponents of decriminalization and de-stigmatization of romantic love and sex between men (Karl Heinrich Ulrichs (1825-1895) is often mentioned in this context), the WHK was the first to do so in a collaborative and organized fashion. The Scientific-Humanitarian Committee was also the first not to concern itself only with men's sexuality and gender. The WHK took a liberal, scientific, and legalistic approach to what now would be called LGBT-activism. Hirschfeld and his peers used other terms at the time and viewed themselves as reformers. Men of letters and breeding like Hirschfeld or Ulrichs invented their own terms based on Greek mythology or scientific Latin.  Words like "gay" or its German counterpart "schwul" are words historically alluding to prostitution and things associated with it, and so to an extent even to the present day not deemed appropriate for "scientific" parlance. "Activist" is the vocabulary of the workers' movement, of which neither Ulrichs nor Hirschfeld were an active part. Such or similar vocabulary might have been used by some of Hirschfelds patients and objects of study, but he and his peers were, to their own minds scientists, reformers, "Urnings" (a term coined by Ulrichs), or "members of a third sex" (a phrase coined by Elsa Asenijeff popularized by Ernst von Wolzogen in his eponymous 1899 novel), to name just a few phrases that could have been used at the time without causing more offense than the very idea of "such things" generally caused at the time, and for quite some there after.

Schöneberg's gay nightlife in the 1920s and 1930s has become the stuff of legends. Schöneberg's nightspots catered to LGBT clientele as well as to curious Moderns seeking the risqué and the "unusual". Bars, cabarets, and ballrooms offered same-sex dancing, cross-dressing, racy shows, exotic dancers, and prostitutes seemingly willing to satisfy any imaginable desire to regulars and diversion seekers just coming to look, marvel, and titter. Visitors at the time, steeped in Victorian and Wilhelmine prudery, were reminded of the biblical "Babylon". But, the 1920s and early 1930s were a time of rapid cultural change. It was an era in which the unimaginable horrors of World War I had called into question formerly held truths and presumptions, and discredited the old order. Experimentation of all kinds was not only possible but the order of the day. Ideas, and forms of expression affecting everything from how people imagined the state and societal norms, to artistic expression in all fields including the relatively new art form, film, to how people dressed, moved, styled their hair, even the shape of everyday items were up for debate. Non-heterosexual people were poised and ready to throw themselves wholeheartedly into this atmosphere of anything goes. The names, images, and ideas that gain prominence in this period go on to influence what we today call "queer sensibility". People viewed as freaks, and poor wretches deserving of sympathy at best before WWI begin to radically self-define and demand to be seen and taken seriously. But also ideas about living together change radically. The labor movement calls the bourgeois family model into question from a leftist perspective, while liberal minded bosses and industrialists begin to see the charm of women in the work force from a business management point of view. A women living without having to depend on a man's income (and without having to eek out an existence in the "shadow economy") becomes real possibility. Marriage, child raising, systems of kinship and how societies "should" work, are all up for negotiation in many places after The Great War, but especially in Berlin.

Many artists, actors, writers and thinkers who are household names to this day get there starts in Berlin of the 20s and 30s. Cabaret singer Claire Waldoff and actress Marlene Dietrich and many more are frequent guests and performers in Berlin's many famous, notorious, and infamous establishments. The first gay demonstration ever also started in Berlin in 1922. The Reichstag nearly decriminalized homosexuality in 1929, but the time was not opportune for change of this kind. In February 1933 a coalition of former nobility, industry moguls and those who pined for the old order essentially handed the chancellorship over to Hitler and his NSDAP. The SA in collaboration with the police then immediately began bullying and intimidating Social Democrats, communists, and anyone else they saw fit to. Homosexual men, as well as women who did not look or act the part the Nazis had chose for "the German woman" were ideal targets for this kind of "sanitizing" operation. The mysterious Reichstag fire gave the now NSDAP lead parliament the wherewithal to suspend civil liberties, and parliamentarianism indefinitely, essentially making Adolf Hitler the Generalissimo of the Reich. The Eldorado, having gained notoriety beyond the city limits of Berlin, had already been the target of raids ordered by the new police chief before the Nazis were officially in power in 1932. It now was hurriedly turned into an SA base and torture house, and things got quiet around Nollendorfplatz. But the Eldorado eventually re-opened under the watchful eye of the Gestapo and things almost went back to normal. When the wealth tourists came for the 1936 Olympics in Berlin, there was much praise form all sides about how Hitler had "cleaned Berlin up", and what a "safe" city Berlin had become, how he and his Brownshirts had "put Germans back to work, and how grand it all was. What went unnoticed by many was what was no longer to be seen. Communists, social democrats and other dissidents, and those who by NS standards had been labeled "undesirables" had been either  in cooperation with the regular police force, incarcerated, or had fled the country. Any reference to their having existed was erased. So thorough was the Nazi purge against real and presumed adversaries of the new German government, that those histories that were not lost forever, had to be painstakingly pieced back together after 1945. So to the history of the first gay movement. The works, the biography, the very existence of one even so prominent and prolific as Magnus Hirschfeld had to be reconstructed in minute archival work beginning in the 1970s.

Of the millions of people killed in German SA dungeons, work camps, through slave labor, and in exterminations camps between 1933 and 1945 several thousand were men who had been sentenced according to section 175 of the Reichs Criminal Code. About 6000 were actually interned to camps. The death rate is presumed to be high. Reliable numbers are not available. Fear of re-incarceration upon the liberation of the camps was great, and proved to be sadly justified. The number of queer women interned during the Nazi period is the subject of great debate in the present. As there were no explicit laws against women having sex with women, or against exhibiting non-gender-conforming behavior, law enforcers had to find other ways to criminalize queer women. Women could be incarcerated for so-called anti-social behavior. The definition of what this constituted was extremely vague. Many thousands of people were arrested on the basis of laws against anti-social behavior. Here again, reliable numbers are not available.

The Memorial to Homosexuals Persecuted Under Nazism is across in the Große Tiergarten across Ebertstraße from Peter Eisenman's Memorial to the Murdered Jews of Europe, and down the road from the Porajmos memorial (The Memorial to the Sinti and Roma Victims of National Socialism) in Tiergarten.

In 1950 the GDR (East Germany) returned to the pre-NS version of Section 175; Section 175a continued to be applied. From the late 1950s homosexual acts among adults were no longer punishable. In 1968, the GDR enacted a completely new penal code, which made same-sex sexual acts with minors a punishable offense for both women and men in § 151. With effect from July 1, 1989, this paragraph was deleted from the East German law books completely.

For two decades, the Federal Republic of Germany (West Germany) stuck to the versions of Sections 175 and 175a from the National Socialist era. During the period from 1945 to 1969 50,000 men were convicted according to Section 175 in West Germany. That is roughly the same amount of convictions as during the Nazi era. The first reform came in 1969 and the second in 1973. These changes effectively made only sexual acts with males under the age of 18 punishable by law. The age of consent for lesbian and heterosexual acts at the time was 14 years. Only in 1994, four years after the unification of East and West Germany was Section 175 completely repealed for the territory of the old Federal Republic. Those who had punished under the broader version of Section 175 in effect until 1969, and many of whom had suffered imprisonment, and an entry under their names in the national criminal record leading to life-long consequences for their employment and housing situations, were not rehabilitated until 2017. Compensation payments, provide those affected were eligible for them at all and still alive, were negligible. Compensation of 3,000 euros and an additional 1,500 euros "for each year of detention suffered" was only granted to those men who were actually convicted.

The  (HAW) (Englisch: Gay Action West Berlin) was the first founded in 1971. Contemporary Berlin actively promotes tourism in gay neighborhoods, including Schöneberg.

Berlin's gayborhoods

Schöneberg

The area near Nollendorfplatz, locally known as "Motzkiez", "Fuggerkiez", or "Nollendorfkiez" ("der Kiez" is a word for neighborhood in the local idiom), may be the best known of Berlin's roughly 4 neighborhoods with some explicitly LGBTIQ+ history, a reputation for being LGBT-friendly, and for having a concentration of LGBTIQ+ localities. A hand drawn map from 1938 (5 years after the begin of Nazi rule) shows no fewer than 57 active or former gay and/or lesbian friendly spots hugging Nollendorfplatz and extending eastward down Bülowstraße. What is strike in the list is the relatively large number of lesbian oriented establishments relative to the somewhat chicer neighborhood of Charlottenburg to the west, which coming in a solid third where LGBT friendly locals are concerned with 52. Mitte heads the list with 99 points of LGBT interest at the time according to this chronicler. Though comparison is somewhat skewed to Mitte's advantage, as the area shown on the map of Mitte is larger, and the venues mention range in style from the very posh Café Kranzler on Unter-den-Linden, to the somewhat more risque but no less fancy  on Friedrichstraße, to the tiny bar and brothel  in the Scheunenviertel that is so small (it still exists today in the basement of Charlotte von Mahlsdorf's ) that the entire bar with séparée fits in the basement of the Museum. The Gründerzeitmuseum is not a large building. Schöneberg is often called the world's eldest gay village, but in light of its history, perhaps "the world's eldest lesbian village" would be more accurate, were it not for the fact that there is only one single lesbian establishment left in the neighborhood, Begine,  139.

In the first one-third of the 20th century the working-class neighborhoods lying roughly between Wittenbergplatz and "Bülowbogen" (the sharp curve in Bülowstraße where it turns southward toward Klumerstraße and Goebenstraße) were popular for their red-light character, racy cabarets, and dance bars, though they had likely already existed for half a century at the time. It can be assumed that Potsdamer Straße, as a main trading artery to the south and west, knew no time in which there were no brothels to be found along it. Northern Schöneberg however owes much of its post-World-War-II renown to an English-American writer Christopher Isherwood's Novels Mr Norris Changes Trains (1935), and Goodbye to Berlin (1939) which take place there, and to the Broadway musical Cabaret (1966) and later Film Cabaret (1972) based loosely upon Isherwood's novels. The author himself only moves to the neighborhood a year after he had followed fellow writer W. H. Auden to Berlin, and he and Auden spent the majority of their time in the area around Hallesches Tor where their regular bar became the (no longer existent) Cosy Corner on Zossener Straße. The area from the southern end of Friedrichstraße well into the district of Neukölln is know at the time for its inexpensive bars and café where people loitered in the hope of being picked for odd jobs, bartered and traded on the unofficial market, and engaged in prostitution. The area around Hallesches Tor, and the queer life that once boomed there is humorously immortalized in Claire Waldoff's song Hannelore (1928, M.: Horst Platen, T.: Willy Hagen). To Auden and Isherwood, both from upper class British backgrounds, both educated in England's most prestigious schools, this relatively permissive atmosphere in which for what to them was very little money, you could have a group of young men entertain you in the hope you might buy the next round of beer, must have felt like an manner of El Dorado. Isherwood's initially finds lodging not far away from Hallesches Tor in Kreuzberg, before moving to a boarding house at Nollendorfstraße 17 near Nollendorfplatz in December, 1930 where remains for May 1933. Isherwood's The Berlin Stories do not come out until well into the Nazi era.

During the 1920s / 1830s themselves, the area lying roughly to the south of KaDeWe gains notoriety through the German author of vice novels, 's booklet, Führer durch das „lasterhafte“ Berlin (roughly Guide to licentious Berlin), published under the pseudonym Curt Moreck, Leipzig, 1931 (republished 2018). Führer durch das lasterhafte Berlin was aimed at higher income people "slumming", and promised to show interested visitors the "pleasures" of the "shadows". It is Haemmerling who initially makes the cabaret Eldorado infamous, which in its Motzstraße 15 (present house number 24) location provides the inspiration for the cabaret in Isherwood's Berlin novels. Not that Schöneberg's  clubs and makeshift brothels were necessarily unique to this area of Berlin. They could be found in all of Berlin's slums at the time. But northern Schöneberg was uniquely well situated close to Berlin's high income Neuer Westen with its fancy clubs and cabarets, and also easily accessible with the new Berlin subway (built 1909) which connected the fashionable eating and drinking establishments, and "serious" entertainment venues near Friedrichstraße and Unter-den-Linden to Berlin's new upper-middle class and upper-class neighborhoods in Berlin's South-West. And as opposed to places that were likely not dissimilar, such as the area around Hallisches Tor that was first hit by the bombs of 1943–1945, and then was the site of some of the most tenacious fighting of the Battle of Berlin, or places not far from Alexanderplatz, which was given a "car city" face lift in the 1950s through 1970s, history largely spared the area near Nollendorplatz the Battle of Berlin. The bulldozing of the neighborhood in the 70s and 80s was prevented by the very steadfast West Berlin squatters' movement. The more fashionable establishments (hand drawn map of lesbian and gay "friendly" venues in Charlottenburg-Wilmersdorf in 1938) of around Kurfürstendamm and Auguste-Viktoria-Platz (after 1947 called Breitscheidplatz) were not only heavily damaged by the air-raids of WWII, much of what little remained disappeared during the automotive city remodeling of Breitscheidplatz in the early 1950s and the plans to build , the so-called  ("Southern Tangent") by rerouting .

But the neighborhoods early 20th century heyday was to be cut short. Already in July 1932, Berlin's new chief of police Kurt Melcher announced an "all-encompassing campaign against Berlin's licentious nightlife" and in October of that year it was decreed that all "dancing events of a homosexual nature were prohibited", see, e.g., the closing of Eldorado. During the ensuing NSDAP rule of the German Reich (1933-1945) the neighborhood's nightlife was all but halted but for a few night spots left open to ensnare, and turn over to the police and Gestapo, those who according to the sharpened Nazi version of Section 175 of the German Criminal Code, "objectively offended the general sense of shame, and subjectively, the debauched intention was present to excite sexual desire in one of the two men, or a third". The incendiary bombs of 1943/1945 turned most German cities into moon landscapes, so too the neighborhoods of northern Schöneberg. Nevertheless (or to a certain extent as a result there of), soon after World War II there was again thriving red-light district in the area, and also several venues popular with an LGBTIQ+ clientele.

Now in the American Sector of Berlin, queer people in northern Schöneberg were not spared the disruption of their lifes through the official atmosphere of suspicion associated with the so-called McCarthy era. LGBTIQ+ life does not come to a stand still, but there is an atmosphere of isolation and caution that pervades queer life in many parts of the world during this period, so too around Nollendorfplatz. For visitors today it may seem hard to imagine that Nollendorfplatz and its side streets were ever anything but quiet tree-lined streets with spruced-up facades and flower boxes. This was as little the case for half-century after WWII as it was in the half-century before. Well into the 1980s the fasionable bars and parties were to be found closer to Kurfürstendamm, and the somewhat queerer places there were to an extent near the eastern end of the grand boulevard roughly between Kurfürstendamm and Kantstraße. But for a very long time visible queerness, except in some very specific settings was discouraged, even to an extent, out of fear of reprisal, among LGBTIQ+ people themselves. It is not until the student revolts in Europe widely associated with the year 1968, that what has come to be called "queer visibility" becomes a liberation strategy and northern Schöneberg is no exception. As in many parts of the world, what was then called the Gay Liberation Movement gains momentum in the early 1970s. In North America the events in 1969 surrounding the Stonewall Inn are seen as the "beginning" of the Gay Liberation Movement. For the West German LGBTIQ+ movement, it is a movie screening in Kino Arsenal at Welserstraße 25 of Rosa von Praunheim's film It Is Not the Homosexual Who Is Perverse, But the Society in Which He Lives (Nicht der Homosexuelle ist pervers, sondern die Situation, in der er lebt). Forty viewers were present. All were men, by all accounts. Most were more or less loosely associated with the protest movements of the period, in West Germany perhaps best described as Spontis. The lesbian group  (LAZ) was founded out of this organization in the months that followed. Unlike in the U.S. where the Stonewall Inn has been made a national historical site, Welserstraße 25 is a childcare center today. Nothing about the building or the former cinema reminds passersby what was set in motion here. If you look very carefully above the door of the childcare center you can see where the former Kino Arsenal's marquee used to be. The original marquee is discreetly located in the underground portion of the foyer below the Deutsche Kinemathek marking the entry way to the new Kino Arsenal.

There is very little left of the original atmosphere of anarchism around Nollendorfplatz, nor of the raucous punk, alternative, rock and new-wave clubs that existed here up until the new underground club-scene in the eastern boroughs of Prenzlauer Berg, Friedrichshain, and Mitte became the places to be. The area is symbolic as Berlin' "Regenbogenkiez" (Rainbow Neighborhood), and is rife with history but it has, with several notable exceptions, as some of Berlin's best cruising bars are here, become sedate. Middle-aged and elder gentlemen tend pleasant shops. There are street cafés selling rainbow colored Bundt Cake. The fetish attire shops, though excellently assorted, have tourist prices. Nevertheless, or precisely because of it, Berlin's best known gayborhood is well worth the visit, and local pride is ardent, especially around the time of the Lesbian and Gay City Festival, Christopher Street Day, The Easter Berlin - Leather and Fetish Week, Folsom Europe, and all of the other festivities that take place in the "Regenbogenkiez" (Rainbow Neighborhood/District).

Other especially LGBT-friendly neighborhoods of Berlin are Kreuzberg, Prenzlauer Berg, and Neukölln. And historically parts of Charlottenburg were known as "Artist's Quarters" (among other things a euphemism for LGBT). From the 1950s well into the 1990s the somewhat "more discerning" set could be seen in the more sedate locales of this tendentially petty bourgeouis part of town. Many places were, and still are in the area between and around Kurfürstendamm and Kantstraße's ends nearer Bahnhof Zoologischer Garten (The Zoo Station). Classics like the Vagabund, Knesebeckstraße 77 (est.: 1969) are still very much there.

Kreuzberg
Kreuzberg still has some of the atmosphere of anarchistic rebellion that characterized the beginnings of the Lesbian & Gay Liberation Movement the 1970s and 1980s. Always a working-class neighborhood, and bordered by the Berlin Wall to the north and to the east from 1962 to 1989, Kreuzberg was, and still is to an extent a sociopolitical micro-climate. The history of Kreuzberg is well documented by the Friedrichshain-Kreuzberg Museum, Adalbertstraße 95a in Berlin-Kreuzberg, near many of Kreuzberg's queer / queer-friendly landmarks, like Möbel Olfe, SüdBlock / Aquarium, Café Kotti, Roses, AYO queer women's collective café, SO36 and others. The culture space and club SO36 remains the heart of "alternative" scene, and is implicitly and explicitly queer, with the clubs queer flag-ship event the regular legendary Gayhane parties organized by activist and artist , and SO36 resident DJane DJ Ipek. This is certainly in no small part due to Governing Mayor Klaus Wowereit's (Social Democratic Party of Germany) bold example in 2001, where upon his nomination, against a backdrop of media speculation, candidate Wowereit took would-be detractors' wind out of their sails with the now legendary proclamation, "I am gay, and that is as it should be!" (German: Ich bin schwul, und das ist auch gut so!) at a public party caucus. Nevertheless District Mayor Herrmann's accomplishment was no mean feat even in tendentially liberal-minded Berlin.

Kreuzberg has also gained a certain of notoriety beyond the Berlin's city limits among LGBTIQ* people and others for having "its own CSD". The event has gone by among other names " TransGenialer CSD", "Kreuzberg CSD", and "X*CSD". It has taken place most years since 1997 on or around the date of the larger CSD parade. One on-line tourist information mentions the event in one sentence with ancillary Pride events like "Gay Night at the Zoo". Admittedly the event's coming into being is connected with animals, however not of the caged sort but with common rats. Not the rodents as such, but rats as an analogy for undesirables. Before the Abgeordnetenhaus of Berlin, on February 27, 1997, the chair of the Christian Democratic Union Party of Berlin,  expressed his impatience with what in his opinion was the city's hesitance to eradicate what he and his party associates viewed as the ills that afflict Berlin:

This did not sit well with many committed citizens who strive day in and day out to make Berlin and the world a more livable place. For one, the word "Gesindel" (Eng.: rabble) has a decidedly 1933-1945 ring to it in German, and furthermore a great many of those who took offence to the statement were not entirely sure chairperson Landowsky was not thinking of them. Against the backdrop of an on-going factional dispute within the LGBTIQ* movement that dates back to the mid-1970s (see ), and with tempers flaring over Landowsky's most recent remarks, the organizers of the larger CSD event decide that beginning that year there would be an entry fee for vehicles and floats taking part in the Berlin pride parade. At a meeting in Club SO36 a group of queer activists decided to construct their own float, dress as rats, and equipped with plenty of mud for the throwing, to pay an unannounced visit to the 1997 Pride Parade. The reaction was as was to be expected, and Berlin's "alternative" queer protest event Kreuzberg Pride was born.

Prenzlauer Berg
The East German Gay and Lesbian Movement has contributed greatly to LGBTIQ+ history and contemporary life. The East German HIB (English: Homosexual Interest Group Berlin) was formed in 1973 not long after the West German HAW (founded 1971), and both groups were in close contact. Members of both groups shared a common cause in working for Lesbian and Gay Liberation. In addition, most in East and West were also interested in reforming socialism, and the societies they lived in - Marxist–Leninist "actually existing socialism" in the East, and liberal, social-democratic capitalism in the West. This fact brought the HIB to the attention of East German State Security Service, as it did the HAW to the attention of the Verfassungsschutz in the West. One further commonality is their shared initial spark. Both were conceived after a screening of Rosa von Praunheim's 1971 film It Is Not the Homosexual Who Is Perverse, But the Society in Which He Lives (German: Nicht der Homosexuelle ist pervers, sondern die Situation, in der er lebt). Albeit in different places and with about 2 years between them but with some of the same members of the audience. Some of the West German fellow activist were also present at the private East Berlin screening in 1973.

 The perhaps best known figure of the East German LGBTIQ+ movement is Charlotte von Mahlsdorf. Charlotte von Mahlsdorf was an organizer and crystallization figure of the LGBTIQ+ rights movements in East and West, as well as during the period after the political turn-around in the GDR. The small early 20th century bar and brothel had originally been located at Mulackritze 15 in Berlin's historically poorest and historically Jewish district, the Scheunenviertel just north-west of Alexanderplatz. The Mulackritze was a typical establishment like many that where to be found in Berlin's slums of the late 19th early 20th century; so to in Schöneberg, whose fame is owed as much to Christopher Isherwood's Novels, and the Broadway musical Cabaret becoming queer iconography in the late 20th century, as it is to the boroughs uniqueness among Berlin's many impoverished neighborhoods, in which, in order to but food on the table and coal in the stove, paying guests were entertained in whatever way possible. In the Mulackritze, even the "Hurenstube" is still visible, a room set aside in a small bar or private flat to provide a bit of privacy when engaging in sex work. The little bar is still on display in Carlotte von Mahlsdorf's museum, which during her life was also her place of residence. Because renting a space for a meeting or a function was difficult in East Germany unless it was for a company party or some other officially sanctioned purpose, Frau von Mahlsdorf hosted many meetings of the HIB and other queer related events. Von Mahlsdorf's museum and grounds are still open to the public. More information is on the Museum's official site www.gruenderzeitmuseum-mahlsdorf.de.

 (English: Sunday Club) was an important part of the LGBTIQ+ movement in the GDR. It was formed in 1987. In the 1990s Sonntags-Club became a registered association under German law (German: eingetragener Verein). The henceforth Sonntags-Club e.V. remains an important event, information, and counselling center for lesbians, gay men, bisexuals, and trans* people, and for all allies and other interested parties.

Prenzlauer Berg was, along with neighboring Berlin-Friedrichshain, a center of dissent and critical thinking in East Germany. The ramshackle 19th century tenement buildings (part of a Wilhelmine Ring that hugs the city limits of Wilhelmine Berlin) were ideal havens for misfits of all kinds, and there was a squatters scene that developed here in some ways analogous to its counterpart in the Western boroughs of Charlottenburg,  Schöneberg, and Kreuzberg. A major obstacle in East German LGBTIQ+ people's lifes was the distribution of housing. In as much as a person's income did not decide how, or whether or not a person was housed, some system of how to distribute this precious good had to be devised. East German decision makers decided, that should be along the lines of who was planning to start a family. When these policies were made "family" meant a woman and a man who married and produced children. In fact there are rumors to this day that young people would conceive a child precisely in order to be "forced" to marry and thereby become eligible for their own flat (and to be able to move out of their parent's home). How often that actually was the reason for having a child is not statistically studied, but it is the case that East German adults became parents at a significantly younger age. Clearly this was not the only reason young East Germans chose to have children at a younger age than their counterparts in the West. There were many ways in which having children was simply easier and less of an existential risk in the East than in the West. This did however have the effect that many LGBTIQ+ East Germans had children, and either had been or still were married (to someone of the other sex) when they began to self-identify as LGBTIQ+. The implication of the housing dilemma for queer people in East Germany, was however that chances of moving out of the parental home were in direct conflict with the possibility to live a non-heteronormative life. This explains in part the allure of the Prenzlauer Berg "alternative" scene for queer people. It was possible to squat, stay with other similarly minded people, while remaining officially residing with one's parent or spouse until a work-around (for which all aspects of life in the GDR were renowned) could perhaps be found. Prenzlauer Berg, for many of the same reasons was a neighborhood where many critical voices in the GDR could be heard, which in turn influenced and were influenced by the East German gay and lesbian activism. The East German environmental movement was very active in Prenzlauer Berg. "Kirche von Unten" was vital to the critical movements who eventually broke the power monopoly of the SED, the state party of East Germany, though many activist were similarly critical of the West as they were of Erich Honecker's "actually existing socialism", and had hoped for a reform of "their" state the GDR, more than the (now seemingly) inevitable absorption of the GDR by West Germany which took place at the German reunification in 1990.

After 1990 many clubs, bars, and underground parties sprang up along the streets and alley ways of Berlin-Prenzlauer Berg. The residents of Prenzlauer Berg had laid the groundwork for an art and oppositional scene that boomed there for over a decade after the German reunification. Some remains, though Prenzlauer Berg's reputation as Berlin's most gentrified borough is not entirely undeserved, and many a wonderfully odd haunt has become the stuff of urban legend.

Friedrichshain
The former East Berlin borough of Friedrichshain has a queer history somewhat similar to Prenzlauer Berg, to which it is somewhat analogous in many ways, were it not for the Stalin era prestige project Karl-Marx-Allee (1949-1961 Stalinallee) which runs north–south through the neighborhood, dividing it down the middle. The "workers' palaces" on Karl-Marx-Alle were reserved for meritable citizens of the "workers' and peasants' state" East Germany, in stark contrast to the buildings behind them on both sides.

It is in Friedrichshain that a further major impulse in the East German Lesbian and Gay Movement arises in the context of the East German Peace Movement of the late 1970s / early 1980s. After having read Martin Siems: Coming out: Hilfen zur homosexuellen Emanzipation former seminarian , theologian , and Matthias Kittlitz formed the first "&apos;Arbeitskreis Homosexualität&apos; in der Evangelischen Studentengemeinde" (English: "Work-group Homosexuality" in the Lutheran Students' Congregation) in Leipzig. First contacts between future members were made while "cottaging" at a "tea room" near Leipzig City Hall. Meetings were held in Christan Pulz's flat in Leipzig until Pulz relocated to East-Berlin in 1983, where he remained a driving force in the East-German Lesbian and Gay Movement, as well as the East-German Peace, Environmentalism and Human Rights Movement.
Upon arriving in Berlin in 1983 Pulz founded an informal gay organization, and inquired with several church communities about the use of their space for meetings. In the Spring of 1983 Pulz turned to the peace work group of the Church of the Samaritan in Berlin-Friedrichshain. Though there was some support from members of the parish, no separate gay work group was established initially, the reason being the (logistical as well as political) pressure which already existed on the church community due to the peace work group and the so-called "Blues Masses", Blues, Rock, and Punk church services already being held at the church. In spite of this temporary setback, lesbian and gay activist remained in contact the church community, and in April 1984, the first formal meeting of the "Schwulen- und Lesbenarbeitskreise der DDR" (English: Gay and Lesbian Work Group in the GDR) took place in the Samariterkirche (Berlin).
Christian Pulz organized the first, public LGBT demonstration, sometimes hailed as the first Christopher Street Day in the GDR. The event took the form of a meeting on May 21, 1983 at the Sachsenhausen Memorial and Museum. Thirteen participants attended, not without being briefly detained by members of the Ministry for State Security. This demonstration was not only the first LGBT protest demonstration in the GDR, it was also the first known commemoration of the persecution of homosexuals under National Socialism by gays and lesbians in the GDR.
The protesters left the following entry in the Sachsenhausen Memorial's guest book:"Today we commemorate the homosexual prisoners who were murdered in Sachsenhausen concentration camp. We were very much saddened that we didn't learn anything about their fate here." 
In 1983 at the Church of the Samaritan's peace workshop, the group around Christian Pulz first appeared publicly under the motto "Lieber ein warmer Bruder, als ein kalter Krieger" (English: Better to be a "warm brother" (German pejorative for "gay man"), than a Cold Warrior).<ref>{{Web archive|url=http://www.horch-und-guck.info/hug/archiv/2004-2007/heft-57/05712-pulz/ |wayback=20160304201450 |text=' 'Horch und Guck, issue 57/2007, main topic: Peace workshop in East Berlin }}</ref> The slogan reverses a derisive remark made publicly by West German politician Franz Josef Strauss in 1970 in which Strauß expressed his conviction it would be better to be a Cold Warrior. The first meeting of the work group took place at the Philippus Kapelle during that same year. In this context the group gave itself the name "Schwule in der Kirche – Arbeitskreis Homosexuelle Selbsthilfe" (English: Gays in the Church - Homosexual Self-Help Work Group), and  wrote the group's political position paper „Zur Schwulen Realität in der DDR“ (English: On gay reality in the GDR).
With the assistance of Bärbel Bohley and Pastor Christa Sengespeick, the group then turned to the  church in Alt-Treptow. The church was spacious, close to the city center, and the church council had confirmed the group as an official work group. The parish pastor  was a committed ally to the group.
As reform and protest movements inside East-Germany gained momentum in the mid to late 1980s, so too did the disruptive, repressive and surveillance activities of the East-German Ministerium für Staatssicherheit (MfS) colloquially known as Stasi, East-Germany's secret police. Correspondingly great were the hopes and expectations East-German activists in particular rested on the political changes of the late 1980s / early 1990s. For former East-German Lesbian and Gay activists in particular the discrepancy between the promises made by West-German politicians and Western media and advertising, and the reality of life after the "Wende" is particularly marked. The general tendency in the official historiography to down-play the role of East Germans in the events of the time in favor of praise for the deeds of (primarily Western) politicians and invocation of the ostensible inevitability of this "End of History" as it is sometimes framed, pertains to LGBT East-Germans in manifold fashion. The phenomenon is nicely summed up by on the German language Wikipedia page about  himself under the heading "Rezeption des Arbeitskreises nach 1989":

 German 
Die Schwulen- und Lesbenbewegungen in der DDR wurden in der Forschung in den ersten 30 Jahren nach dem Ende der DDR von der wissenschaftlichen Forschung weitestgehend ignoriert. Insbesondere in den bekannten Schriftenreihen der Aufarbeitungseinrichtungen wie der BStU oder den wenigen universitär angesiedelten Forschungsinstituten gab es keine für die Forschungsarbeit weiterführenden Publikationen – weder in den thematisch noch in den biographisch orientierten Reihen. Ebenso ist angesichts der zahlreichen Veranstaltungen und Podiumsdiskussionen, die es zur Thematik des politischen Widerstandes in der DDR gab, auffällig, dass nahezu keiner der damaligen Protagonisten öffentlich in Erscheinung getreten ist. Dieses Fehlen der Thematisierung ist selbst ein Anzeichen für die noch andauernden antihomosexuellen Mechanismen, die für repressive Gesellschaftsformen charakteristisch, aber keinesfalls auf die DDR-Gesellschaft beschränkt sind. Bezeichnend dafür ist, dass die Nonkonformität schwuler und lesbischer Emanzipation gerade in Form der selbstbestimmten Gruppenbildung von Menschen, die nicht aufgrund einer speziellen Qualifizierung, sondern aufgrund ihrer persönlichen Betroffenheit politisch aktiv geworden sind, bisher nicht als ein Kernelement politischer und widerständiger Bewegungen unter den zusätzlich verschärfenden Bedingungen einer Diktatur zu einer grundsätzlichen Gesellschaftskritik und -theorie am Beispiel der DDR geworden ist. In den wesentlichen Verlagen dieser Schriftenreihen wie dem Ch.Links Verlag, Vandenhoeck & Ruprecht, Edition Temmen, LIT Verlag oder dem Peter Lang Verlag ist bisher keine einzige wissenschaftliche Publikation zur Schwulen- und Lesbenbewegung in der DDR erschienen. Eduard Stapel veröffentlichte 1999 eine persönliche Auseinandersetzung mit seinem Engagement in der Schwulenbewegung und den Maßnahmen des Ministeriums für Staatssicherheit.[16]

Auf der Berlinale 2013 erschien der Film „Out in Ost-Berlin“ von Jochen Hick und Andreas Strohfeldt. Er dokumentiert das politische Wirken von Schwulen und Lesben in der DDR. Eine zentrale Rolle spielen dabei die Berliner Arbeitskreise um Christian Pulz und Marina Krug „Schwule in der Kirche“ und „Lesben in der Kirche“ sowie Eduard Stapel.
 English 
The gay and lesbian movements in the GDR were largely ignored by scientific research in the first 30 years after the end of the GDR. In particular, in the well-known publication series of the institutions for the "coming to terms" with the history of the GDR such as the Stasi Records Agency (German: Stasi-Unterlagen-Behörde (BStU)) or the few university-based research institutes, there were no publications geared toward academic research - neither in the thematically nor in the biographically oriented series. In view of the numerous events and podium discussions that have been held on the subject of political resistance in the GDR, it is also striking that almost none of the protagonists of the era were called upon to appear publicly. This lack of thematization is in and of itself an indication of the ongoing anti-homosexual mechanisms that are characteristic of repressive forms of society, but are by no means limited to GDR society. It is at the same time remarkable that the non-conformity of gay and lesbian emancipation, especially in the form of the self-determined formation of groups by people who have become politically active not because of a special qualification but because of their personal concernedness, as a core element of political and resistance movements under the additionally aggravated conditions of dictatorship, has not yet become a fundamental social criticism and social theory using the example of the GDR. The main publishers of relevant series of publications, such as Ch.Links Verlag, Vandenhoeck & Ruprecht, Edition Temmen, LIT Verlag or Peter Lang Verlag, have not published a single scientific publication on the gay and lesbian movement in the GDR. In 1999 Eduard Stapel himself published a personal examination of his involvement in the gay movement and the sanctioning measures taken by the Ministry for State Security.

The film "Out in Ost-Berlin" by Jochen Hick and Andreas Strohfeldt was released at the Berlinale 2013. It documents the political work of gays and lesbians in the GDR. The Berlin work groups around Christian Pulz and Marina Krug “Gays in the Church” and “Lesbians in the Church” and Eduard Stapel play a central role in this. (translation by contributor)

Never the less, one of Germany's most influential LGBT organizations with strong ties to contemporary Germany's political establishment across the party spectrum, the Lesben- und Schwulenverband Deutschland (LSVD) was founded as the Schwulenverband der DDR (SVD) in East Germany by East German activists.

The neighborhood has gained sad notoriety for the frictions between far-right hooligans (often coming into the neighborhood looking for trouble from the neighborhoods to the south and east), and Friedrichhain's largely left oriented squatters and dissidents, frictions which date back well before 1990, increase in severity during the 1990s, and continue to smolder to this day (see death of Silvio Meier.)

Friedrichshain in East Germany was however also in some ways not unlike the West Berlin sister-borough of Kreuzberg. It too was pressed up against the wall between East and West, just across the River Spree from its sister borough with whom present day Friedrichshain now forms one borough as Friedrichshain-Kreuzberg. When the dissidents, artists and squatters East and West met across the Spree after 1989 it sparked a creative outburst and atmosphere of coming together that defined the era. And the 1990 and early 2000s were a hedonistic, intoxicating, unrelenting and very, very queer time. Ostgut that went on to become Berghain and Lab.Oratory, and KitKatClub, are only the tip of the queer iceberg. Revaler Straße and the area to the south and east toward Boxhagener Platz are bursting with new creative projects, as well as culture and party spaces. Now well-known tourist destination, 's Himmelreich has been serving customers since 2003. And the somewhat more traditional gay bar Große Freiheit 114 which opened in 2005 is as popular as ever.

Since the border between East and West Berlin was opened in November 1989 the police East and West have been trying to make Friedrichshain's squatters pay rent. Emblematic for this process, which has not lost its actuality to this day, was the struggle between the residents of Mainzer Straße and rent-seeking land lords represented by the local authorities and law enforcement. Juliet Bashore's 25 minute film The Battle of Tuntenhaus, U.K. 1991, (watch on squattheplanet.com) deals with this era from a queer perspective. In October 2020, Berlin's last anaracha-queer-feminist house project Liebig 34 was forcibly remove from the building they were renting. The twenty members of the collective went quietly and calmly, under applause from their supporters.Erik Peter, Gereon Asmuth: Hausprojekt Liebig 34 in Berlin - Applaus für die Geräumten. On: taz.de. Dated: October 8, 2020. URL: https://taz.de/Hausprojekt-Liebig-34-in-Berlin/!5719147/. Last viewed: September 20, 2020.

Neukölln
If Prenzlauer Berg is the Gen X-er of Berlin's gayborhoods then Neukölln is the Millennial. Over the past decade or two a young, creative, among other things queer scene has grown all around Weserstraße and southward toward Neukölln City Hall (Rathaus Neukölln). Not that the area was without its own LGBT spots in the past, but even the older bars are enjoyed by locals and ex-pats from around the globe, having made old strip clubs like Ficken3000 on Urbanstraße for example very much their own. But most notably perhaps, the old brass, and juggernaut of LGBTIQ+ culture center's and clubs, the club  also moved to Rollbergstraße 26 in Neukölln in November 2013.

Queer business Berlin
The city of Berlin has always presented itself as a place where the clocks ticked a little differently. You belong in Berlin, literally: You're crazy, my child. You must go to Berlin) dates back to the 1870s. The quip was not unlikely intended as an insult to Berliners by non-Berliners at first. But the residents of Berlin quickly made the adage their own. The unofficial Berlin local anthem  (Paul Lincke, 1904) alludes to the permissive reputation of the city in its second verse:

So it is almost a logical sequitur that Berlin should present itself as a queer city. Making a PR strategy out of being queer is not new to Berlin. , aka Curt Moreck's 1931 booklet "Führer durch das lasterhafte Berlin" (English roughly: Guide to licentious Berlin) is an early example.

Like many places in the world, not everyone in Berlin past or present was or is unreservedly enthusiastic about the city's image as a bastion of personal freedom of expression, and open-mindedness. Historically speaking, except for in some very specific branches of business, being associated with overt sexuality was not necessarily good advertising. A business becoming associated with queerness moreover, could be the kind of PR that had the potential to put a company out of business. This began to change in the early 1990s. The business world, above all retail, began to realize LGBTIQ+ consumers (gay and bisexual men first and foremost) could be a very lucrative clientele. Some of the very first businesses to put small rainbow colored stickers in their windows were pharmacies. As anti-retroviral drugs became available, pharmacies were eager to make queer customers aware that they were welcome. Prices for anti-retroviral medication, though high to the present day, were even higher in the early days of anti-retroviral therapy. Before too long there were rainbow-stickers in the windows of all kinds of businesses from ice cream parlors to filling stations, often independently of whether the business was queer owned or operated, whether the business had past or present ties to the community, or whether there was any discernible queer-friendliness about the enterprise.

In today's Berlin there are very few businesses that do not welcome, and many that actively cater to an LGBTIQ+ clientele. They are to be found all over the city, and range from very small, very specialized LGBTIQ+ owned / operated businesses to major national and international corporations. A good overview of which businesses actively advertise in the LGBTIQ+ community can be found in Germany's eldest (first issue: April, 1984), most widely read, free of charge, LGBTIQ+ publication, Berlin's queer monthly, the Siegessäule. The Siegessäule contains a very comprehensive map of LGBTIQ+ relevant business, entertainment venues, bars, clubs, etc. There is an on-line edition. There is a calendar of events. Many articles are in English as well as German. The Siegessäule is generally available at news stands, in many shops, in LGBTIQ+ clubs and bars and elsewhere.

Business owners and operators in the LGBTIQ+ community are often involved in community related activities and projects. The Regenbogenfond der schwulen Wirte e.V. (gay hotel & restaurant owners' Rainbow Fund) organizes among other things the annual Lesbian and Gay City Festival on Motzstraße. LGBTIQ+ business people and allies are frequent contributors to queer health and anti-violence projects. One example among many is the anti-violence project Maneo, whose sponsor list reads like a who's-who of Berlin's queer and queer-friendly entrepreneurs. Most collectively managed businesses and/or projects have regular community events like book presentations, Küfas (a form of self-organized, collective "soup kitchen"), etc.

Both the Wirtschaftsweiber, an organization of and for lesbians in business, and the Völklinger Kreis, an organization for the interests of gay (men) executives and entrepreneurs, have seats in Berlin.

One business sector that often gets overlooked / ignored regardless of location is prostitution. Sex-workers are the topic of many a work of art from Berlin's widely celebrated "Weimar Period". It is hard to avoid meeting or at least seeing sex-workers of all genders, specializations and fee-scales when coming to, moving around in, or leaving the LGBTIQ+ village around Nollendorfplatz. Sex-work is as much a part of the queer present of the neighborhood, as it is of its queer history. The history of queerness on the whole is intimately linked to sex-work and sex-workers. The very word "gay" is a historic euphemism for prostitution. Nevertheless, relationship between parts of the LGBTIQ+ movement and community, and sex-work / sex-workers is historically ambivalent at best. It is hard to say whether this has changed for the better or for the worse with the growing embourgeoisment of parts of the LGBTIQ+ spectrum. Be that as it may, sex-work and sex-workers have always contributed significantly to the economy and, quite literally, to the sex-appeal of Berlin, a reality that Berlin has written on its (semiofficial) banner for most of a century and a half, like no other cities but perhaps Paris, Las Vegas, or Bangkok.

The laws and ordinances that apply to, and the services that the city provides for the sex-work industry, its workers and its clients are summed up (in German only) on a page on the city web-site, under https://www.berlin.de/sen/frauen/keine-gewalt/prostitution/. All of the organizations and information sources on the berlin.de page are excellent resources. Missing in the list, and perhaps not immediately self-evident, is the AIDS action group Berliner AIDS-Hilfe e.V.. Language settings are available on the page. The organization has a strong focus on prostitution in their prevention and information work, and has very knowledgeable staff, which can be reached via anonymous telephone hot-line where assistance in foreign languages can be arranged.

What proportion of Berlin's €162.95 Billion (official) GDP (2021) is the outcome of queer business is difficult to determine. But Berlin would not be merely a culturally poorer place without it.

Media
The lesbian magazine L-MAG and the queer magazines Siegessäule and Blu are based in Berlin. These three magazines also contain English articles and cover a wide variety of issues relating to gay life in Berlin and Germany, as well as politics and culture.

 Institutions 
The Schwules Museum created on December 6, 1985, is the world's first LGBTIQ+ museum. It is located at Lützowstraße 73 on the district border between Schöneberg and the former borough of Tiergarten now incorporated into Berlin-Mitte. The museum is dedicated to archiving, studying, and presenting LGBTIQ+ history, culture and activism locally and around the world, past, present and future. For decades Schwules Museum was a volunteer collective that depended on the time and energy of its members, and on donations from the community. Since 2009, the museum has received additional funding from the Senate of Berlin. Exhibits, events, podium discussions and more approach a vast range of topics and points of view. For example, in partnership with Temple University and Computerspielemuseum (Video Game Museum, Berlin), in 2018-2019 the museum hosted the RAINBOW ARCADE exhibition, which explored the queer history of video games.

Politics

Klaus Wowereit was the Governing Mayor of Berlin from 21 October 2001 until 11 December 2014. Wowereit came out during the 2001 elections and stated publicly on a party congress that he was gay, with the now famous sentence "I am gay - and that's good the way it is!". Later on, he described it as the most important sentence in his life. After his outing, Wowereit received a lot of support from fellow party colleagues and the wider public and eventually won the Berlin State Elections of 2001 and remained Governing Mayor of the city for nearly 13 years.

Festivals
Berlin Pride is the gay pride parade in Berlin, the first took place in 1979. Other pride parades in Berlin are Dyke March and Kreuzberg Pride, also known as Transgenialer CSD, which ran from 1997 to 2013. In 2019, two alternative pride events are Libertarian CSD and Radical Queer March.

Other festivals include Folsom Europe, Easter in Berlin, the Hustlaball and the Yo!Sissy Queer Music Festival.

Notable residents
A
 Nasser El-Achmad (*1996) - activist, first PoC member of the CSD e.V., Berlin Steering Committee, filed suite (2015) against father and uncle on the basis of Section 235 of the Strafgesetzbuch (German penal code) over an attempted forced marriage to a woman
 Bini Adamczak (*1979) - feminist, writer on communism and queer politics
 Seyran Ateş (*1963) - lawyer and women's right activist, founder of the liberal Ibn Rushd-Goethe Mosque (which expressly welcomes LGBTIQ+ worshipers) in Berlin, imam (one of the world's very few female imams)

B

  (*1957 - †1993) - photographer who documented gay West Berlin, and later the AIDS epidemic in the 80s/early-90s, legacy property of gay museum, Berlin  (grave (Berlin): Alter St.-Matthäus-Kirchhof ★)

 Norbert Bisky (*1970) - a Berlin based artist, an important representatives of a new figurative painting in the 21st century (Link to artist's web-site)
 Tabea Blumenschein (*1952 - †2020) - actress and artistic polymath, perhaps best known for her role in the cult classic Ticket of No Return, Ulrike Ottinger (1979) 
Aug.18.1993 Birgit Bosold (*) - became first woman in on the Board of Directors of Schwules Museum* (SMB) in 2006, instrumental in bringing the Petra Gall collection to SMB, co-curator of such groundbreaking projects as Homosexualität_en (along with Dr. Dorothée Brill and Detlef Weitz, with research contributed by Dr. Sarah Bornhorst, Noemi Molitor and Kristine Schmidt)
 Adolf Brand (*1874 - †1945) - publisher of Der Eigene (The Unique) the first gay journal in the world, published Berlin, 1896 - 1932
 Michael Brynntrup (*1959) - media artist and pioneer of queer cinema
 Horst Buchholz (*1933 - †2003) – actor, voice-over artist, the German Alain Delon

C
 Heiner Carow (*1929 – †1997) - film director, screenwriter, director of Coming Out (1989), the first East German LGBT-themed film

D
 Martin Dannecker (*1942) - sexologist, author, early founder of the German Lesbian & Gay rights movement, co-counder of Queer Nations e.V.
 Vaginal Davis (*1969) - performing artist, painter, curator, composer, filmmaker, writer (residing in Berlin since 2006)
 Marlene Dietrich (*1901 - †1992) - German-born American actress & singer (grave (Berlin): III. Städtischer Friedhof Stubenrauchstraße, section 17–486)

E

 Carolin Emcke (*1967) - award-winning journalist and author, political theorist and activist
 Selli Engler (aka Selma Engler) (*1899 - †1972) - lesbian activist of the 1920s and 1930s, writer, publisher of Die BIF – Blätter Idealer Frauenfreundschaften (Papers on Ideal Women Friendships)

F

  (married name: Tim Jiménez Domínguez) (*1973) well known chansonnier and actor
 Frederick the Great (*1712 - †1786) - Prussian ruler and expansionist, enlightened despot
 Matthias Freihof (*1961) - television actor and director, played the role of Philipp Klarmann in Coming Out (Heiner Carow, 1989), the first East German LGBT-themed film (interview in German with Matthias Freihof)
 Matthias Frings (*1953) - journalist, TV presenter and writer, well known to TV audiences in Germany as one of the moderators of the 1990s show  - title is a pun on queer icon Zarah Leander sung song "Kann denn Liebe Sünde sein?" (English: can love be a sin?)

G

 Petra Gall (*1955 - †2018) - photographer, lesbian-feminist activist, culture manager, artistic legacy care of Schwules Museum*, click here for Schwules Museum* page
 Helga Sophia Goetze (aka Helga Sophia) (*1922 - †2008) - artist, writer, sex-positive feminist, from 1983 - early 2000s she held hourly "Ficken ist Frieden" (fucking is peace) vigils near the Kaiser Wilhelm Memorial Church (grave (Berlin): Alter St.-Matthäus-Kirchhof ★★)
  (aka Lale Lokum) (*1964) artist, dancer, actor/playwright/producer, comedian, comic artist, drag artist, founded cabaret troupe Salon Oriental (1995) with 

H
 Lotte Hahm (aka Charlotte Hedwig Hahm) (*1890 - †1967) - prominent lesbian and trans* activist from the 1920 through the Nazi period into the mid-1960s, organizer, club manager.
 O. E. Hasse (*1903 - †1978) - film actor, director (grave (Berlin): Waldfriedhof Dahlem)
  (*1964) - politician (Bündnis 90/ Die Grünen), district mayor of Berlin-Kreuzberg (2013-2021)
 Magnus Hirschfeld (*1868 - †1935) - sexologist, reformer, founder of the WhK

I

 Christopher Isherwood (*1904 - †1986) - British-American author
  (*1972) - music producer, Intersectional activist, resident DJane at SO36, regular DJane at Gayhane, Member of Kanakwood artists' network, founding member of Gays & Lesbians aus der Türkei e.V. (GLADT), active in the activist group 

J
 Dr. med. Heiko Jessen (*) - specialist for infections disease specializing in HIV

K
 Carina Klugbauer (*1988) - political theorist, gender theorist, exhibit manager at Schwules Museum* (SMB), co-curator of the project Homosexualität_en (along with Dr. Birgit Bosold, Dr. Dorothée Brill and Detlef Weitz, with research contributed by Dr. Sarah Bornhorst, Noemi Molitor and Kristine Schmidt)
 Katja Koblitz - chair of the Spinnboden e.V. lesbian archive, expert for the lesbian herstory of Berlin (brief overview on place2be.berlin)
 Ilse Kokula (*1944) - teacher, author, lesbian activist
 Elmar Kraushaar (*1950) - journalist, early gay activist & AIDS activist
 Kevin Kühnert (*1989) - politician (SPD), general secretary of the Social Democratic Party of Germany (SPD) and member of the Bundestag representing Berlin-Tempelhof-Schöneberg (since 2021)
 Dirk Kummer (*1966) - actor, plays the role of Matthias in Coming Out (Heiner Carow, 1989), the first East German LGBT-themed film
  (*1904 - †1999) – helped Gertrude Sandmann hide from the Nazis in WWII, co-founder of the group L 74 (Lesbos 1974), writer/publisher lesbian periodical UKZ – Unsere kleine Zeitung  (grave (Berlin): Alter St.-Matthäus-Kirchhof ★★)

L
 Klaus Lederer (*1974) - politician (Die Linke), member of the Abgeordnetenhaus of Berlin (since 2001), deputy mayor and senator for culture and Europe (since 2016)
 Yony Leyser (*1985) - U.S. born film director living in Berlin
 Audre Lorde (*1934 - †1992) U.S. black, lesbian-feminist writer and activist. During multiple stays in Berlin 1984-1992 strongly influenced German POC, and lesbian-feminist movements, documentary: Audre Lorde – The Berlin Years 1984 to 1992 by Dagmar Schultz, Ria Cheatom, Ika Hügel-Marshall and Aletta von Vietinghoff (2011) Watch trailer on Vimeo
 Marinus van der Lubbe (*1909 - †1934) - Dutch born, young vagrant who under mysterious circumstances admitted to and was executed for setting the Reichstag fire, 1933
  (*1965) author, LGBT activist, TV producer, journalist with a regular column in die Siegessäule and frequent articles in taz

M
 
 Jeanne Mammen (*1890 – †1976) painter and illustrator, well known for her illustrations of The Songs of Bilitis (grave (Berlin): III. Städtischer Friedhof Stubenrauchstraße,  Columbarium, Urn room 45, No. 97)
  (*1962) - fashion photographer in East Germany for the GDR fashion magazine Sibylle, gay squatter, punk in East Berlin's Prenzlauer Berg in the 1980s, documentarist of Berlin's club culture from the 1990s on, member of the founding group of Ostgut / Berghain, best known as Berghain's door personUlrich Gutmair: Wir sind Punks, wir sind schwul. On: taz.de: Dated: August 23, 2014. URL: https://taz.de/Wir-sind-Punks-wir-sind-schwul/!306546/. Last viewed: September 20, 2022
 Susanne Matthes (*1961- †1983) - a young women raped and murdered in 1983 on her way home from the lesbian disco Die 2 in Berlin-Neukölln - a crystallizing event of the (lesbian-)feminist movement of the early 1980s
 Inge Meysel (*1910 - †2004) - immensely popular and very outspoken actress, came out as bi at age 94 (2004)
 Charlotte von Mahlsdorf (*1928 - †2002) - East German preservationist, Trans* activist, author (grave (Berlin): , section: W 402/403/404)
  (*1966 - †2005) - political cabaretist, drag queen, AIDS activist (grave (Berlin): Alter St.-Matthäus-Kirchhof ★)
 Erich Mühsam (*1879 - †1934) - poet, playwright, anarchist, revolutionary (grave (Berlin): Waldfriedhof Dahlem)
 Wolfgang Müller (*1957) - artist, musician, author, co-founder (with ) of the band Die Tödliche Doris, author of the manifesto of the young West Berlin music and art scene Geniale Dilletanten (Merve Verlag, Berlin, 1982) following the 1981 music festival  in the Tempodrom, the book contains contributions by Gudrun Gut, Matthias Roeingh (later known as ), Tabea Blumenschein, Blixa Bargeld and 

N
 Ella Nik Bayan (*1980- †2021) - 2015 fled Iran via Turkey and the "Balkan Route", self-immolation on Alexanderplatz to protest racism, trans*phobia, and the violent EU border practices (grave (Berlin): Zentralfriedhof Friedrichsfelde (Socialist Cemetery))
  (*1882 - †1963) - author, anarchist, partner of Erich Mühsam
 Jan Noll (*) - journalist, DJ, drag artist, activist, and chief editor of Siegessäule

O

 Ulrike Ottinger (*1942) - filmmaker and photographer, well known for her Berlin Trilogy, Ticket of No Return (German: , 1979), Freak Orlando (1981) and Dorian Grey in the Yellow Press (German: , 1984), (Ulrike Ottinger's website)

P

 Rosa von Praunheim (*1942) - pioneer of queer cinema, activist
 Nihad Nino Pušija (*1965) - photographer, Roma activist, documents "the queer, (post-)migrant night-live in Berlin of the 1990s" (More on Nihad Nino Pušija on roma-biennale.com)

R
 Hilde Radusch (*1903 - †1994) - resistance fighter, communist and Socialdemocratic politician, women's rights activist, lesbian activist (memorial: Winterfeldt- / Eisenacherstraße) (grave (Berlin): Alter St.-Matthäus-Kirchhof ★★)
 Rio Reiser (aka Ralph Christian Möbius) (*1950 – †1996) - singer / songwriter, lead singer of Ton Steine Scherben, bard of the squatters movement and the Sponti protest movements in West Germany and Western Europe in general in the 1970s and 1980s (grave (Berlin): Alter St.-Matthäus-Kirchhof ★
 Cillie Rentmeister (*1948) - historian, culture scientist and researcher of cultural conditions of women and of gender, 1974-1977 member of Flying Lesbians, Europe's first women's rock band (more about Dr. Rentmeister on feministberlin.de (in German)
 Ernst Röhm (*1887 - †1934) - openly gay, early member of the NSDAP, leader of its paramilitary SA, murdered at Hitler's command in the internal purge, Night of the Long Knives
 Ruth Margarete Roellig (*1878 – †1969) – writer, author of the city guide Berlins lesbische Frauen (1928), Nazi collaborator

S

 Gertrude Sandmann (*1893 - †1981) artist, lesbian Activist of Jewish background, co-founder of the group L 74 (Lesbos 1974) (Memorial: Eisenacher Straße 89 ) (grave (Berlin): Alter St.-Matthäus-Kirchhof ★★) 
  (*1959) - hair stylist, began his career in the East German fashion industry, East German gay punk in the 1970s and 80s, well known figure of Berlin club culture after 1990, biography Ich bin nicht auf der Welt, um glücklich zu sein, Schwarzkopf & Schwarzkopf publishers, Berlin, 2018.
  (*1952) - actor, author, chanson artist
 Dagmar Schultz (*1941) sociologist, filmmaker, publisher professor, maker of films on May Ayim (2007), and Audrey Lorde (2012), co-founder of West Berlin's first feminist health center (Feministische Frauen-Gesundheits-Zentrum e.V. Berlin (FFGZ), Hornstraße 2, Berlin-Kreuzberg (former location))
 Renée Sintenis (*1888 – †1965) - sculptor, medalist, graphic, creator of the Berlin Bear model for the Berlinale's Golden Bear (grave (Berlin): Waldfriedhof Dahlem)
 Juwelia Soraya (aka Stefan Stricker) (*1963) - Berlin drag artist, performer, painter, founder of Galerie Studio St. St.
 Wieland Speck (*1951) - activist, cinematic polymath, panorama coordinator at the Berlinale, co-founder of the Teddy Award
 Fatma Suad (aka Hakan Tandoğan) (*) - cabaretist, culture manager, activist, founder of Gayhane event in SO36, regular participant in the organizing collective of the regular syndicalist Kreuzberg Pride (portrait photo of Fatma Suad by Nicolaus Schmidt)

U
 Karl Heinrich Ulrichs (*1825 – †1895) lawyer, jurist, journalist, writer, early sexologist, coiner of the term "Unanian", often cited as the "first gay man", Karl-Heinrich-Ulrichs-Straße in Berlin-Schöneberg is named his honor (view on openstreetmap.org)
  (*1958 - †1996) - Artist, musician, composer, founding member (with Wolfgang Müller) of the band Die Tödliche Doris (grave (Berlin): Alter St.-Matthäus-Kirchhof ★)

V
 Gloria Viagra (aka Michel Gosewitsch) (*1966) - drag queen, activist, DJ(ane)

W

 Claire Waldoff (*1884 – †1957) - cabaretist and chanteuse
 Jacky-Oh Weinhouse (*1987/1988) (aka Sebastian Böhm) – drag queen and homo lobbyist
 Anne Will (*1966) - journalist, television moderator, host of Anne Will on NDR television - the most watched show on German TV in 2021
 Klaus Wowereit (*1953) - politician (SPD), governing mayor of Berlin (2001-2014)

Z

  (*1963) - cabaretist and drag Queen, co-founder of  queer, underground film and theater company

Key: 
★ EFEU e.V. map of queer relevant graves in Alter St.-Matthäus-Kirchhof, Berlin-Schöneberg (click here to visit EFEU e.V. web-site) 
★★ EFEU e.V. list of graves of prominent Women in Alter St.-Matthäus-Kirchhof, Berlin-Schöneberg (click here to visit EFEU e.V. web-site)

Berlin LGBTIQ+ community organizations

Berliner AIDS-Hilfe e.V. - Berlin chapter of the national  (DAH) (founded: September 23, 1983), fighting stigmatiziation and discrimination of people with HIV/AIDS, providing STI testing and information, and community support
BEGiNE - Treffpunkt und Kultur für Frauen e.V. - Opened as a women's café and culture center in 1986 by a collective of women who squatted and renovated the building Begine is in to this day
The Berlin State Office for Equal Treatment and Against Discrimination (LADS)
The Berlin State Office for Equal Treatment and Against Discrimination (LADS), Special department for LGBTI-concerns - German: "Fachbereich LSBTI" (only available in German)
Berlin Leder und Fetisch e.V. - representing Berlin's leather and fetish culture, hosts of the annual Easter Berlin, Leather and Fetish Weekend
Checkpoint BLN - sexual health center serving gay and bisexual men, their partners, trans and inter people (regardless of sexual orientation)
CSD Berlin Pride
The Easter Berlin - Leather and Fetish Week
GLADT e.V. - organization of black and PoC lesbians, gays, bisexuals, Trans*, Inter* and queers in Berlin
Kulturring in Berlin e.V. - AG Rosa Winkel - a work group focusing on the persecution of LGBT people during the Nazi era
Lesbenberatung - lesbian counselling center offers confidential, free of charge counselling for lesbians, bisexual women, trans*, inter*, non-binary and queer people
L-Mag - Das Magazin für Lesben, Berlin's lesbian oriented periodical available at well assorted news stands
LesMigras - anti-dicrimination & anti-violence center of Lesbenberatung Berlin
Mann-o-Meter - community based gay health center
RuT – Rad und Tat, Offene Initiative Lesbischer Frauen e.V. - events, counselling, culture for lesbians of all ages with and without disabilities, Initiators of the multi-generational cultural and living center for lesbians and queer women, RuT Frauenkultur & Wohnen
RuT – Rad und Tat Berlin gGmbH - support and planning organization of the multi-generational cultural and living center for lesbians and queer women, RuT Frauenkultur & Wohnen
Schwulenberatung - LGBTIQ+ counselling center
Schwules Museum* - gay museum
SIEGESSÄULE - We are queer Berlin - Berlin's largest LGBTIQ+ monthly (many articles with English translation), free of charge in most community shops, restaurants, bars and clubs
Sonntagsclub e.V. - a community based organisation that offers event, information and counselling for the LGBTIQ+ Community (located in Berlin-Prenzlauer Berg and originating in the East German LGBTIQ+ Liberation Struggle)
Subway - Hilfe für Jungs - established in 1992, Subway offers a drop-in center for daily needs like shower, meal, clothes washing, medical examination and counselling, etc. for boys and men up to 27 years of age who work in sex work
TransInterQueer (TrIQ) - a community based organization catering to the needs of trans* inter* and non-binary people (page in German)

See also

 LGBT rights in Germany
 Persecution of homosexuals in Nazi Germany and the Holocaust
 Schwules Museum

Notes

Further reading
 Mel Gordon: Voluptuous Panic, The Erotic World of Weimar Berlin, Los Angeles 2000, 
 Manfred Herzer: Liebe und Vernunft der Urninge, Das schwule Berlin vom 18. Jahrhundert bis zum Jahr 1933, in: Berlin von hinten, Berlin 1981, S. 7–38
 Ross, Alex. "Berlin Story." The New Yorker. January 26, 2015.
 Hofmann, Sarah. "Berlin is gay, and that's a good thing." DW. 26 Jun. 2015. 
 Rollman, Hans. "Uncovering Queer History in "Gay Berlin"." Popmatters''. 11 March 2015.

External links 
L-Mag - Das Magazin für Lesben, Berlin's lesbian oriented periodical available at well assorted news stands
Schwules Museum* (gay museum)
SIEGESSÄULE - We are queer Berlin - Berlin's largest LGBTIQ+ monthly (many articles with English translation), free of charge in most community shops, restaurants, bars and clubs

 
Culture in Berlin
Berlin
Berlin